(1802–1853) was an Osaka-based Japanese ukiyo-e woodblock print artist active during the first half of the nineteenth century. A member of the Utagawa school, he was one of a very select group of kamigata-e print artists who were able to support themselves solely as professional artists.

Biography 

Shigeharu was born Yamaguchi Yasuhide in Hizen Province, Nagasaki in 1802 (year 2 of Kyōwa). His father,  operated the  money changing business. He moved to the  district of Osaka around 1820, to study printmaking with his first mentor,  (fl. c.1815-1841). Some have suggested that Shigeharu also studied under master print designer Hokusai; however, there is no definitive evidence to support this.
As was the custom for ukiyo-e artists, Shigeharu used various gō throughout his career. He published his first print in 1820 under the name , acknowledging both his birthplace and his first teacher. He adopted the name Ryūsai Shigeharu, which incorporated two characters from his second master's name, in the spring of 1825.
In response to political strife during the period, Shigeharu returned to Nagasaki in the early 1840s. He died on May 5, 1852, aged only 51. His daughter, Yonejo, went on to become a painter, whose work was particularly coveted by foreign collectors.
There is some dispute over Shigeharu's activity in the final years of his life. Some suggest that he may have returned to Osaka in the late 1840s, and continued to produce prints under the name Kunishige from 1849 until the time of his death. Others argue that ōkubi-e bust portraits signed by Kunishige and other works signed by Shigeharu dating to c.1849-1851 are likely the work of different artists.

Works 

In the  era (4/1818-12/1830), Shigeharu began working in various media including single-sheet prints, book illustration, theater billboards and programs, and paintings. His artistic output is generally dated to the period c.1820-1849, with the years 1829-1831 marking the peak of his work in  single-sheet print design. There are several blank periods in his career from which no or very few prints are known, including mid-1822 through mid-1825 and 1838.

From 1831 on, Shigeharu provided illustrations for a number of books including The Three Kingdoms of Actors' Customs . The work he did with his master, Shigenobu, on a book of fashionable patterns in courtesan clothing earned him particular acclaim.
Operating under the firm name , Tenki was active from 1816 into the 1850s.

Reputation 

Contemporary estimations of Shigeharu's work tend to be favourable. According to a compendium of Osaka gossip published in 1835, Shigeharu was "good at everything." A manuscript of artist biographies from the mid-1840s characterizes him as "better than the rest," and notes his professional status. Modern critics, however, have been less positive, describing him as "an indifferent artist". This notwithstanding, Shigeharu was, if not the only professional ukiyo-e artist working in Osaka in the late nineteenth-century, one of the very few on the amateur-dominated scene.

Collections 

Ryūsai Shigeharu's work is found in many collections, including the following:
 
 
 
 The ROM

See also 

 Actor Arashi Rikan II as Osome (Ryūsai Shigeharu)
 Konishi Hirosada

Notes

External links

References 

 

 

 

 

 

 
 
 

 

 

 

 

 

 

 

 

 

 

 

 

Ukiyo-e artists
1802 births
1853 deaths
19th-century Japanese painters